Kaka is a rural locality (a selo) in Akhtynsky District, Republic of Dagestan, Russia. The population was 1,667 as of 2012. There are 6 streets.

Geography 
Kaka is located 11 km west of Akhty (the district's administrative centre) by road. Kaluk is the nearest rural locality.

References 

Rural localities in Akhtynsky District